Nickel is a surname.

Notable surnames 

 Arno Nickel (born 1952), German correspondence chess Grandmaster
 Barbara Nickel (born 1966), Canadian poet
 Bernd Nickel (1949–2021), German former footballer
 Eckhart Nickel (born 1966), German author and journalist
 Elbie Nickel (1922–2007), American National Football League tight end
 Ernest Henry Nickel (born 1925-2009), Australian-Canadian mineralogist
 Gil Nickel (born 1939-2003), American vintner
 Goschwin Nickel (1582–1644), Jesuit priest and the 10th Superior-General of the Society of Jesus
 Grace Nickel (born 1956), Canadian artist
 Greg Nickels (born 1955), two-time mayor of Seattle
 Günther Nickel (born 1946), Olympic athlete
 Hans Nickel (1907), German rower
 Harald Nickel (1953–2019), German former footballer
 Heinrich Nickel (born 1894-1979), German general
 Herman W. Nickel (born 1928), United States Ambassador to South Africa during the Reagan administration
 Horst Nickel (born 1934), German biathlete
 James Nickel (born 1930), Canadian canoeist
 Jens Nickel (born 1965), German ten-pin bowler
 Jochen Nickel (born 1959), German actor
 Larry Nickel (born 1952), Canadian composer
 Mike Nickel (born 1965), Canadian politician
 Rafael Nickel (born 1958), Olympic athlete
 Richard Nickel (1928–1972), American photographer and historian
 Uta Nickel (born 1941), German politician
 Walter R. Nickel (1907–1989), American dermatologist
 Wiley Nickel (born 1975), attorney

Fictional characters 

 Nomi Nickel, fictional Mennonite teenager from Miriam Toews's novel A Complicated Kindness

See also
 Nickell, a surname
 Nichol, a surname
 Nikkel, a surname

German-language surnames
Surnames from given names
Russian Mennonite surnames